Dea is the first full-length album by Russian power metal band Catharsis. It was released in 2001 by Irond. The album was the most commercially successful Russian metal release of 2001. It was released internationally in 2002 by Hammer Müzik. In 2004, the album, together with the Febris Erotica EP, was re-released by Irond.

Track listing
 "Igni et Ferro" – 6:55
 "A Trip into Elysium" – 5:00
 "My Love, the Phiery" – 7:55
 "Etude №1 A-Moll for Piano, op. 1" – 2:48
 "Pro Memoria" – 5:27
 "Silent Tears" – 5:13
 "...Into Oblivion" – 2:59

Personnel
Oleg Zhilyakov – vocals
Igor Polyakov – rhythm guitar, acoustic guitar
Julia Red – keyboards
Anthony Arikh – lead guitar, acoustic guitar
Vladimir Muchnov – drums
Vadim Bystrov – bass

References

2001 albums
Catharsis (Russian band) albums